A meridarch or meridarches (from meris, "division", and -arches, "ruler") was the civil governor of a province in the Hellenistic world (4th-1st centuries BCE), and could be translated as "Divisional Commissioner". Only three mentions of meridarchs are known from ancient sources, one from Palestine, the two others from the Indo-Greek kingdom in India, one on a vase from Swat, the other on a copper plate from Taxila.

Judea
Shortly after 153 BCE, Josephus relates, Alexander Balas appointed Jonathan Maccabeus as strategos (general) and meridarch (civil governor of a province) of Judea, and sent him back with honors to Jerusalem (I Macc. x. 51–66; Josephus, "Ant." xiii. 4, § 1).

Indo-Greek kingdom

At the far eastern end of the Hellenistic world, in northern India, an inscription in Kharoshthi has been found on a relic vase  Swāt, referring to a "meridarch Theodorus" and his enshrinement of relics of the Buddha:

Another mention of a Meridarch appears on the Taxila "meridarch" plate. The plate reads:

References

Ancient Greek titles
Indo-Greeks
Hellenistic civilization